Cowhill is the name of several places in the United Kingdom, including:
Cowhill, Aberdeenshire
Cowhill, Derbyshire
Cowhill, Gloucestershire
Cowhill, Greater Manchester